Cyperus capensis is a species of sedge that is native to southern parts of Africa.

See also 
 List of Cyperus species

References 

capensis
Plants described in 1842
Flora of South Africa
Flora of Mozambique
Flora of Swaziland
Taxa named by Stephan Endlicher